Naterra International, Inc., is a privately held based consumer products sales and marketing company based in Coppell, Texas.  Naterra manages several brands, including Baby Magic and Tree Hut.  Mr. Jin K. Song is CEO. Naterra is headquartered in Coppell, Texas.

History
Naterra was founded in Dallas, Texas in 1922 as the Superior Products Company. Initially, the company specialized in manufacturing private label and owned brand products, including Sue Pree and Lisa Monay, which were introduced in 1945 and were in distribution with retailers such as Wal-Mart in 1964. In 1965, the company trademarked its Lisa Mornay brand.

Superior Products Company was acquired in 1994 by the Song Family and became Naterra International, Inc. In 2002, Naterra founded the Tree Hut brand.  In 2008, Naterra acquired the Baby Magic Brand from Ascendia Brands.

Brands
Current brands include:
Baby Magic
Tree Hut

Past brands:
Skin Milk
TimeBlock
FootSteps
CandleSong
Sue Pree
Lisa Mornay
Aqua Spa
All that Glitters

References

External links
Naterra

Manufacturing companies established in 1922
Manufacturing companies based in Texas
Companies based in the Dallas–Fort Worth metroplex
1922 establishments in Texas